Jacinto "Jack" Calvo González (June 11, 1894 – June 15, 1965) was born Jacinto Del Calvo in Havana, Cuba. He was an outfielder for the Washington Senators in 1913 and 1920. He played in 34 games, had 56 at bats, 10 runs, 9 hits, 1 triple, 1 home run, 4 RBIs, 3 walks, a .161 batting average, a .203 on-base percentage, a .250 slugging percentage, 67 total bases and 19 sacrifices. He died in Miami, Florida.

Calvo played Negro league baseball with the integrated Long Branch Cubans in 1913 and 1915 but most of his baseball career was in Cuba. He was the younger brother of fellow Negro leaguer Tomás Calvo. Calvo played winter baseball in the Cuban League from 1913 to 1927 and was elected to the Cuban Baseball Hall of Fame in 1948.

Notes

References

External links

1894 births
1965 deaths
Washington Senators (1901–1960) players
Major League Baseball outfielders
Major League Baseball players from Cuba
Cuban expatriate baseball players in the United States
Baseball players from Havana
Long Branch Cubans players
Almendares (baseball) players
Atlanta Crackers players
Habana players
Los Angeles Angels (minor league) players
Marianao players
Orientals players
Victoria Bees players
Vancouver Beavers players
San Francisco Seals (baseball) players
Little Rock Travelers players
Tampa Smokers players
Fort Worth Panthers players
Memphis Chickasaws players
Cuban expatriate baseball players in Canada